The 1994–95 Alabama Crimson Tide men's basketball team represented the University of Alabama in the 1994-95 NCAA Division I men's basketball season. The team's head coach was David Hobbs, who was in his third season at Alabama.  The team played their home games at Coleman Coliseum in Tuscaloosa, Alabama. They finished the season with a record of 23–10, with a conference record of 10–6, good enough for third place in the SEC Western Division.

The only key loss from the prior season was James "Hollywood" Robinson to the NBA.  Senior forwards Jason Caffey and Jamal Faulkner and sophomores Antonio McDyess and Eric Washington were the hub of the team.

The Tide reached the semifinal of the 1995 SEC men's basketball tournament final, but lost to Arkansas.  The Tide earned an at-large bid to the 1995 NCAA tournament, defeating Penn in the first round and losing to eventual Final Four participant Oklahoma State.

Roster

References 

Alabama Crimson Tide men's basketball seasons
Alabama
Alabama
1994 in sports in Alabama
1995 in sports in Alabama